This is a demography of the population of Saint Vincent and the Grenadines including population density, ethnicity, religious affiliations and other aspects of the population.

Population

According to the 2001 population census Saint Vincent and the Grenadines has a population of 106,253, a decrease of 256 since the 1991 census.
The population decrease of St. Vincent is caused by a high rate of emigration, as natural growth is positive.

Vital statistics

Structure of the population 

Structure of the population (01.07.2008) (Estimates):

Ethnic groups
Saint Vincents's population is predominantly African (77,390 in 2001; 72.8% of the total population) or of mixed African-European descent (21,303; 20%). 1.4% of the population is East Indian (1,436 residents in 2001) and 1.4% white (608 Portuguese and 870 other white).

Saint Vincent & the Grenadines also has a small indigenous (Amerindian/Carib) population. During the past decades the indigenous population changed from 3,347 at the 1991 census (3.1% of the population) to 3,898 at the 2001 census (3.6% of the population) to 3,280 at the 2012 census (3.0% of the population).

Black Caribs are originally from the island of Saint Vincent, formed in the 18th century by the mixture between Kalinago and enslaved Africans who escaped. A part of their community (now known as Garifuna) was expelled from St. Vincent in 1797 and exported to the island of Roatán, Honduras, from where they migrated to the Caribbean coast of the mainland of Central America and spread as far as Belize and Nicaragua. While the Garifuna have retained their Kalinago language, the Black Caribs of Saint Vincent and the Grenadines speak Creole English.

The remaining 0.8% of the population includes Chinese and people from the Middle East.

Language
While the official language is English most Vincentians speak Vincentian Creole, an English-based creole, as their mother tongue. English is used in education, government, religion, and other formal domains, while Creole (or "dialect" as it is referred to locally) is used in informal situations such as in the home and among friends.

Religion

Protestant 75% (Anglican 47%, Methodist 28%), Roman Catholic 13%, other (includes Hindu, Seventh-Day Adventist, other Protestant) 12%.

According to the 2001 census, 81.5% of the population of Saint Vincent and the Grenadines is considered Christian, 6.7% has another religion and 8.8% has no religion or did not state a religion (1.5%).

Anglicanism constitutes the largest religion, with 47.8% of the population. Methodists are the second largest group (28%). The next largest group are Roman Catholics (13% of the population), followed by  other religions including Hindu, Seventh-Day Adventist, other Protestant  (12% of the population)

Between 1991 and 2001 the number of Anglicans, Brethren, Methodists and Roman Catholics decreased, while the number of Pentecostals, Evangelicals and Seventh-day Adventists increased.

References

 
Society of Saint Vincent and the Grenadines